Jalan Sungai Tua (Selangor state route B23) is a major road in Klang Valley region, Selangor, Malaysia

List of junctions

Roads in Selangor